Çatax (also, Çataq and Chatakh) is a village and municipality in the Tovuz Rayon of Azerbaijan.  It has a population of 3,189.  The municipality consists of the villages of Çatax, Qandalar, Kazımlı, Qoşa, Cirdək, Muncuqlu, Pələkli, Şıxheybət, and Hacılar.

References 

Populated places in Tovuz District